Fort Green Springs is an unincorporated community and census-designated place (CDP) in Hardee County, Florida, United States. Its population was 190 as of the 2020 census.

Geography
The community is in northwestern Hardee County and is bordered to the north by Fort Green.

Demographics

References

Unincorporated communities in Hardee County, Florida
Unincorporated communities in Florida
Census-designated places in Hardee County, Florida
Census-designated places in Florida